Some Girls: Live in Texas '78 is a live concert film by the Rolling Stones released in 2011. This live performance was recorded and filmed in 16 mm during one show at the Will Rogers Auditorium in Fort Worth, Texas on 18 July 1978, during their US Tour 1978 in support of their album Some Girls. The concert film was released on DVD/Blu-ray Disc, combo (DVD & CD set) and (Blu-ray Disc & CD set) on 18 November 2011. Originally the CD was exclusive to the combo sets, but in June 2017, the CD was made available separately for the first time.

Track listing

Bonus features (DVD/Blu-ray only)
 Mick Jagger – 2011 interview (15m)

Saturday Night Live (7 October 1978) (21m)
 "Tomorrow" (with Dan Aykroyd and Mick Jagger)
 "Beast of Burden"
 "Respectable"
 "Shattered"

''ABC News 20/20'' interviews with The Rolling Stones (Airdate: 20 June 1978) (5 min)
 Interviewed by Geraldo Rivera during tour-rehearsal, Woodstock, New York, June 1978

Personnel
The Rolling Stones
 Mick Jagger – lead vocals, guitar, electric piano
 Keith Richards – guitars, backing and lead vocals
 Ronnie Wood – guitars, backing vocals, pedal steel guitar
 Bill Wyman – bass guitar
 Charlie Watts – drums

Additional personnel
 Ian Stewart – piano
 Ian McLagan – organ, electric and acoustic pianos, backing vocals
 Doug Kershaw – violin on "Far Away Eyes"

Original 1978 production crew
 Jerry Carraway
 Live sound recording by BJ Schiller
 24 track recording by Michael Garvey
 Produced by Jack Calmes
 Directed by Lynn Lenau Calmes
 Lead cameraman: Phillip Thomas
 Camera operator: Jerry Calloway
 Camera operator: Richard Kooris
 Camera operator: Philip Pheiffer
 Film loader: Bob Hall
 Assistant camera:  Michael McClary
 Assistant camera:  Wes Dempster

2011 production
 Audio mix by Bob Clearmountain
 Director of film production Phil Davey

References

External links
 
 The Rolling Stones – Some Girls: Live in Texas '78 (2011) CD, DVD & Blu-ray releases and credits at Discogs.com

The Rolling Stones films
The Rolling Stones video albums
The Rolling Stones live albums
2011 live albums
2011 video albums
Polydor Records live albums
Polydor Records video albums
Live video albums
Eagle Rock Entertainment live albums
Eagle Rock Entertainment video albums